Jallikattu refers to:

 Jallikattu, an Indian traditional spectacle
 Jallikattu Kaalai, a 1994 Indian Tamil film
 Jallikattu (1987 film), a 1987 Indian Tamil film
 Jallikattu (2019 film), a 2019 Indian Malayalam film